The women's 400 metres at the 2022 World Athletics U20 Championships was held at the Estadio Olímpico Pascual Guerrero in Cali, Colombia on 2, 3 and 4 August 2022.

Records
U20 standing records prior to the 2022 World Athletics U20 Championships were as follows:

Results

Round 1
Qualification: First 4 of each heat (Q) and the 4 fastest times (q) qualified for the semifinals.

Semifinals
Qualification: First 2 of each heat (Q) and the 2 fastest times (q) qualified for the final.

Final
The final was held on 4 August at 17:42

References

400 metres women
400 metres at the World Athletics U20 Championships